Leucadia may refer to:

 Lefkada or Leucadia, a Greek island in the Ionian Sea
 Leucadia National, a New York City-based holding company
 Leucadia State Beach, California
 Leucadia, a district in the city of Encinitas, California